David Weeks (died 2 November 2021) was a former Conservative Leader of Westminster City Council who served on the council from 1974 to 1998.

Career
He was leader of the council from 1991 to 1993, deputy leader from 1983 to 1991, and acting leader during 1987 to 1988. He chaired several of the council's major committees: Policy and Resources from 1991 to 1993; Planning and Development, 1987 to 1991; Finance and Personnel, 1983 to 1987; and Housing, 1979 to 1983. From 1977 to 1979 he was the chief whip of the council's ruling Conservative group.

He was Leader of the Council at the time it agreed to buy back the Westminster Cemeteries after they were sold without proper provision for maintenance - a decision made by Shirley Porter to which David was not a party.

Homes for Votes scandal
Weeks was deputy leader to Shirley Porter at the time of the "Homes for votes scandal" and was found jointly liable along with Porter and others to the tune of £36 million by the District Auditor, but this was reduced on appeal by the High Court. In a 2001 judgement, Lord Bingham of Cornhill, described Dame Shirley and David Weeks, as guilty of a "...deliberate, blatant and dishonest misuse of public power. It was a misuse of power by both of them not for the purpose of financial gain but for that of electoral advantage. In that sense it was corrupt." Lord Scott said:The corruption was not money corruption. No one took a bribe. No one sought or received money for political favours. But there are other forms of corruption, often less easily detectable and therefore more insidious. Gerrymandering, the manipulation of constituency boundaries for party political advantage, is a clear form of political corruption.

Personal life
David died on 2 November 2021, after fifty years of marriage leaving his widow Heather. He was not buried in a Westminster cemetery.

See also
Westminster cemeteries scandal

References

Further reading

20th-century births
2021 deaths
Councillors in the City of Westminster
Conservative Party (UK) councillors
Leaders of local authorities of England

Year of birth missing